Race tracks designed for the sport of Motocross

References

Motocross
Motorsport venues in the United States